Ornamenta (minor planet designation: 350 Ornamenta) is a relatively large main-belt asteroid, measuring 118 km in diameter. It is classified as a C-type asteroid and is probably composed of carbonaceous material.

Ornamenta was discovered by Auguste Charlois on December 14, 1892, in Nice, France. It was named in 1905 in honor of Antoinette Horneman, who was a member of the Société astronomique de France.

During 2002, the asteroid was observed occulting a star. The resulting chords provided a diameter estimate of 99.5 km.

This object is the namesake of a family of 14–93 asteroids that share similar spectral properties and orbital elements; hence they may have arisen from the same collisional event. All members have a relatively high orbital inclination.

References

External links 
 
 

000350
Discoveries by Auguste Charlois
Named minor planets
000350
18921214